Tehwa Sritammanusarn is a Thai retired football player who currently plays for Thailand Division 1 League side Nakhon Ratchasima.

Honours
Muangthong United
Thai Division 1 League: 2008 Champion

References

1982 births
Living people
Tehwa Sritammanusarn
Association football midfielders
Tehwa Sritammanusarn
Tehwa Sritammanusarn